Mackay Estate Gate Lodge is a historic gatehouse located at East Hills in Nassau County, New York. It was designed in 1899 and built in 1900 - 1902 by architect Stanford White of McKim, Mead & White in the French Baroque style.  It is a small but imposing stone building with a central entrance flanked by small square lodges and topped by a steep slate mansard and pyramidal roof.  The central vehicular entrance contains a wrought iron gate of elaborate design.  The house was originally a component of Clarence Mackay's Harbor Hill Estate.

It was listed on the National Register of Historic Places in 1991.  It is one of three remaining buildings listed at that time; the others are the Mackay Estate Dairyman's Cottage and Mackay Estate Water Tower.

References

Houses on the National Register of Historic Places in New York (state)
Houses completed in 1902
Houses in Nassau County, New York
National Register of Historic Places in Nassau County, New York